Shamilla Miller (born 14 September 1988) is a South African actress, television presenter and model. She is best known for her roles in Amaza, Forced Love, Tali's Baby Diary, Troy: Fall of a City, and The Girl from St. Agnes.

Personal life
Miller was born on 14 September 1988 in Cape Town, South Africa. She graduated with a Bachelor's degree in Live Performance and Film from AFDA, The School for the Creative Economy (AFDA) in 2009.

Career
She started acting career with theatre plays under David Kramer and Alfred Rietman. In the meantime, she played the lead roles in the theatre productions such as Krismas van Map Jacob’s (2009) and Baby (2010). From 2011 to 2015, she joined with Vulture Productions and performed in five sitcom-style plays performed at the Artscape Theatre and Grahamstown festival. Then she appeared in many television commercials in the preceding years.

In 2013, she made film debut with Hollywood blockbuster Zulu directed by Jérôme Salle. In 2014, she joined with the SABC1 youth drama series Amaza, where she played the role "Ayesha Ibrahim". In 2014 she became a television presenter, where she presented the kids TV show Challenge SOS. Then in 2015, she played a guest role of "Chanel" in the second season of the SABC1 comedy-drama series Forced Love. In the meantime, she appeared in many short films such as: Lazy Susan, As ek huistoe kom, Nommer 37 and Kleingeld. For her role in the short Nommer37, she won best actress for her role as Pam at the Mzanzi short film festival.

In 2016 made it to the "Top 12" of the BET reality competition Top Actor Africa. In the same year, she acted in the Maynard Kraak's film Sonskyn Beperk with the role "Nicola". In international arena, she acted in the film Bock to school mom and serial Hooten and the Lady. At the end of 2016, Shamilla moved to Johannesburg where she made notable television roles. Meanwhile, she played the role "Daniella" in the popular SABC3 soap opera Isidingo. In 2017, she joined with the third season of e.tv drama Z'bondiwe and played the role "Hilda Miller". In the same year, she played the supportive role "Athena" in the BBC drama series Troy: Fall of a City. Then in 2018, she appeared in the SABC3 police procedural serial The Docket with a minor role. In that year, she appeared in the Showmax's light-hearted comedy Tali’s Wedding Diary with the role "Kim". The show became the most successful launch day of any series on Showmax ever. In 2019, she played the role "Riley Morgan" in the South Africa's Netflix original Blood & Water. In the same year, she appeared in the Showmax's first original series The Girl From St Agnes with the role "Jenna". The show later broke the record for the most number of unique viewers in the first 24 hours, previously held by Tali’s Wedding Diary.

In 2021, she appeared in two television serials, where she played multiple roles in the SABC2 comedy serial Comedy Mixtape and then with the role "Kelly Peterson" in the Netflix South Africa original Dead Places.

Filmography

References

External links
 
 Shamilla Miller at TVSA

1988 births
Living people
Cape Coloureds
South African television actresses
South African stage actresses